Monique Jacot (born 1934) is a Swiss photographer and photojournalist.

Early life
Jacot studied at the école des Arts et Métiers de Vevey from 1953 to 1956. Gertrude Fehr was one of her professors.

Career
Jacot was among the first women photojournalists.

She travelled to Yemen frequently in the 1980s, and provided reporting for numerous noted magazines and newspapers, including Camera (magazine), Elle, L'Illustré, Schweizer Illustrierte, Du, Réalités, and Vogue Paris.

Àlso in the 1980s, Jacot published several works on the conditions faced by women: Femmes de la terre in 1989, on the subject of Swiss women working in agriculture, Printemps de femmes in 1994 and Cadences : l'usine au féminin in 1999.

During her career she was a staff photographer for the World Health Organization.

Her work is included in the collection of the Museum of Fine Arts Houston.

Awards
 1974: Federal prize for Applied Arts
 2005:  Grand prize in photography from the Fondation vaudoise pour la culture.
 2020: Grand Prize in Design, on the recommendation of the Swiss Design Commission

References

20th-century Swiss photographers
Swiss photojournalists
Swiss women photographers
Living people
1934 births
Women photojournalists